The 2000 World Seniors Masters was a professional invitational snooker tournament, which took place on 27–28 May 2000 at the Royal Automobile Club in London. Fifteen players participated, with David Taylor receiving a bye into the quarter-finals. All matches were one frame in length. Willie Thorne defeated Cliff Thorburn 84–8 in the final, winning £10,000.

Main draw
Results from the tournament are shown below.

References

2000 in snooker
2000 in English sport
Snooker competitions in England
Sports competitions in London
Senior sports competitions